Nagaur Lok Sabha constituency is one of the 25 Lok Sabha (parliamentary)  constituencies in Rajasthan state in India.

Assembly segments
Presently, Nagaur Lok Sabha constituency comprises eight Vidhan Sabha (legislative assembly) segments. These are: 

Degana and Merta are the other tehsils (Vidhansabha Constituency) of Nagaur district which are not part of Nagaur Lok Sabha Constituency. Constituency delimitation commission before 2009 General Election, Separated Degana and Merta from Nagaur Loksabha Constituency and made them part of Rajsamand (Lok Sabha constituency).

Members of Parliament

Election results

2019

2014

2009

2004

See also
 Nagaur district
 List of Constituencies of the Lok Sabha

Notes

External links
Nagaur lok sabha  constituency election 2019 result details

Lok Sabha constituencies in Rajasthan
Nagaur district